Pradeep Yadav may refer to:
Pradeep Yadav (Nepalese politician)
Pradeep Yadav (Indian politician)
Pradeep Yadav (cricketer), Indian sports person
Pradeep Yadav (director), Indian television director